Miguel José Sena Manterola (6 November 1884 - 16 March 1969) was a Spanish footballer who played as a forward for Real Sociedad. His brothers, Alfonso and Gregorio, also played for Real Sociedad.

Club career
Born in San Sebastián, he began his career with Unión Vizcaino. In 1907, the best players from Vizcaino and Athletic Club came together to form Bizcaya, which was specially created to take part in the 1907 Copa del Rey, and he Sena and his brother Alfonso were elected into the team, and both featured in the final, which ended in a 0–1 loss to Madrid CF. After the Bizcaya team was discontinued, Miguel followed Alfonso to Recreation Club, but his spell there was cut short when a conflict between the club's members caused the team to split with several players (including the Sena brothers, Elosegi, Arrillaga and Dorda) leaving to create a new team in 1908, the San Sebastian Football Club.

The team had to play under the name of Club Ciclista to play in the 1909 Copa del Rey, which they unexpectedly, but convincingly won after beating Español de Madrid 3–1 in the final, in which he featured alongside his brother, Alfonso. A few months after this victory, the players who had won the tournament founded the Sociedad de Football (now known as Real Sociedad) on 7 September 1909, definitively disassociating themselves from the Cycling Club. After four seasons with Sociedad, he retired in 1913.

Honours
Club Bizcaya
Copa del Rey: Runner-up 1907

Club Ciclista
Copa del Rey: 1909

References

1884 births
1969 deaths
Spanish footballers
Association football forwards
Footballers from San Sebastián
Real Sociedad footballers